WPEL is a religious formatted radio station playing Southern gospel music in Montrose, Pennsylvania. It is a non-commercial, listener-supported radio station owned and operated by the Montrose Broadcasting Corporation, a non-profit organization founded by W. Douglas Roe.  Mr. Roe was the original licensee and died in 1984.

WPEL (AM) broadcasts on a frequency of 800 kHz AM with 1,000 watts of power daytime and 135 watts of power during nighttime hours; 800 AM is a clear-channel frequency, on which XEROK-AM is the dominant Class A station.

History

WPEL has been on the air since May 30, 1953. The funding of the station came, in part from the Montrose Bible conference, of which W. Douglas Roe was the executive director.

On October 17, 2007, WPEL (AM) changed frequencies from former 1250 kHz, which it had been transmitting on for over 50 years, to 800 kHz in an effort to be better heard in the area with its limited transmit power. In 2015, WPEL (AM) began rebroadcasting its programming on an FM translator at 95.5 in Endicott, New York.

Ownership
The station is sister to WPEL-FM, 96.5 MHz, also licensed to Montrose. WPEL-FM began broadcasting on June 5, 1961.

The Montrose Broadcasting Corporation also owns and operates radio stations WPGM-AM/FM in Danville, Pennsylvania and WBGM-FM in New Berlin, Pennsylvania.

Larry Souder served as president of the Montrose Broadcasting Corporation from 1984 to 2017, and WPGM since 1964.  As of April 1, 2017, James Baker, the manager of WPEL, assumed the roles of President and CEO

References

External links
 

 
 

PEL
Radio stations established in 1953
Southern Gospel radio stations in the United States
PEL (AM)